The IV Corps was a corps of the Army of the Republic of Vietnam (ARVN), the army of the nation state of South Vietnam that existed from 1955 to 1975. It was one of four corps in the ARVN, and it oversaw the Mekong Delta region of the country.

The Mekong Delta was the heartland of agricultural South Vietnam, it encompassed the fertile alluvial plains formed by the Mekong River and its main tributary, the Bassac River. With its sixteen provinces, the Delta contained about two-thirds of the nation's population and yielded the same proportion in rice production. The terrain of IV Corps differed radically from other regions. Flat and mostly uncovered, it consisted of mangrove swamps and ricefields crisscrossed by an interlocking system of canals, natural and artificial. During the monsoon season, most of the swampy land north of Route QL-4, generally called the Plain of Reeds, was inundated, especially when alluvial waters raised the level of the Mekong River from July to October. Other undeveloped swampy areas along the coast had turned into havens that sheltered Viet Cong (VC) main force units just as the scattered bases inland offered good refuge for local guerrillas.

The 7th Division based in Mỹ Tho was a part of the IV Corps, and due to the division's close proximity to the capital Saigon was a key factor in the success or failure of the various coup attempts in the nation's history. In the coup attempt of 1960, the loyalist Colonel Huỳnh Văn Cao used the 7th Division to storm into Saigon to save President Ngô Đình Diệm.

In 1962, Diem decided to split the command of the area in the south around Saigon into two, the former III Corps area being reduced in size to cover the area northeast of Saigon, and the newly created IV Corps taking over the west and southwest. Cao was promoted to general and assumed command of the new IV Corps Tactical Zone, which included the area of operations of his 7th Infantry Division.

ARVN forces under the control of IV Corps consisted of three infantry divisions, two mobile and six border ranger groups. In addition, the territorial forces of MR-4 totaled about 200,000, by far the most numerous among the four military regions. The 7th Division was headquartered at Đồng Tâm Base Camp in Dinh Tuong Province; the 9th Division was located in Sa Đéc and the 21st Division usually operated in the Cà Mau Peninsula from its headquarters at Bạc Lieu. Despite the substantial combat support and significant advisory effort, both military and civilian, provided by the United States, primary responsibility for the combat effort in IV Corps had always been Vietnamese, even during the period when U.S. units operated in the Mekong Delta.

Central Office for South Vietnam's Resolution No. 9 disseminated in 1969, emphasized the strategic importance of the Mekong Delta and conceived it as the principal battlefield where the outcome of the war in South Vietnam would be decided, the PAVN/VC infiltrated the 1st Division Headquarters and its three regiments, the 88th, 101D and 95A into IV Corps. This effort succeeded despite heavy losses. IV Corps forces were thrown off-balance and the pacification effort declined as a result of extensive PAVN/VC attacks and shellings. Not until after the PAVN/VC's sanctuaries beyond the border had been destroyed during the Cambodian Campaign and their capability to resupply from the sea eliminated were these 1st Division forces compelled to break down into small elements and withdraw. Part of these elements fell back into bases within IV Corps; others retreated toward Cambodia.

IV Corps was therefore able to regain the initiative during 1971. Its efforts during the year consisted of continuing operations on Cambodian soil to assist the weaker Khmer National Armed Forces and interdicting PAVN/VC supply routes into the Mekong Delta. Concurrently, it also emphasized the elimination of PAVN/VC's bases in the Delta. In addition, they also established a new system of outposts to maintain government control over what had been the PAVN/VC's long-established base areas. The most significant achievements during this period were the neutralization of the extremely heavy enemy
fortifications of Base Area 400 in the That Son (Seven Mountains) area by the 9th Division, the continued destruction of Base Area 483 in the U Minh Forest by the 21st Division, the coordinated activities of the 7th Division and territorial forces in Base Area 470 on the boundary of Dinh Tuong and Kien Phong Provinces, and finally, the successful pacification campaign in Kien Hoa Province, the cradle of VC insurgency. As a result of these achievements, the situation in IV Corps was particularly bright by early 1972. About 95% of the Delta population lived in secure villages and hamlets. Rice production had increased substantially and education was available to every child of school age. Prospects for the Delta's future looked promising as key government programs such as Land-to-the-Tiller and Hamlet Self-Development were gaining momentum. The four-year Community Defense and Local Development Plan that the government had initiated in March 1972 presaged an even brighter future for the farmers of the Mekong Delta.

On 3 May 1972 Corps' commander Lieutenant General Ngô Quang Trưởng, was appointed commander of I Corps and Major General Nguyễn Vĩnh Nghi assumed command of the Corps.

Divisions

References 

Corps level formations of South Vietnam
Military units and formations established in 1955
Military units and formations disestablished in 1975
1955 establishments in South Vietnam